World Team or Team World is a designation for a sports team in many competitions. It is usually equivalent to a "rest of the world" team, which is pitted against a particular territory.

Competitions featuring a world team

Note that in the above sports there also exist national teams taking part in other competitions

All-World's Team

Some "Team World" or "World Team" teams are all-star teams with rosters drawn up from the world's players as an honors project.

See also
Team North America
Team Europe
World XI

References

Multinational sports teams